The following is a list of awards and nominations received by actress Sutton Foster.

Foster is an actress known for her extensive work on the Broadway stage. She has received seven Tony Award nominations receiving two wins for her performance in Thoroughly Modern Millie in 2003 and Anything Goes in 2011. She is currently starring opposite Hugh Jackman in the Broadway revival of The Music Man. She has also earned a Grammy Award nomination for Best Musical Theater Album for Anything Goes.

Theater
Sources:PlaybillVault Internet Broadway Database BroadwayWorld

Note: The year given is the year of the ceremony

Grammy Awards

Tony Awards

Drama Desk Awards

Drama League Awards

Outer Critics Circle Awards

Laurence Olivier Awards

Miscellaneous awards

Television awards

Critics' Choice Awards

Miscellaneous awards

References 

Foster, Sutton